Bennet Sherard may refer to:
 Bennet Sherard, 2nd Baron Sherard (1621–1700), Custos Rotulorum of Rutland, MP for Leicestershire
 Bennet Sherard (MP) (1649–1701), Member of Parliament for Rutland
 Bennet Sherard, 1st Earl of Harborough (1677–1732), British peer and Member of Parliament
 Bennet Sherard, 3rd Earl of Harborough (1709–1770), Earl of Harborough